Fritzi Brod  (1900–1952) was an Austro-Hungarian Empire-born American artist. Her work is included in the collections of the Smithsonian American Art Museum, the National Gallery of Art, Washington the Art Institute of Chicago and the Whitney Museum of American Art.

References

20th-century American women artists
1900 births
1952 deaths
Artists from Prague
Czechoslovak emigrants to the United States